McCaskie is a surname. Notable people with the surname include:

Norman McCaskie (1911–1968), English cricketer
Sonja McCaskie (1939–1963), British alpine skier
Zachary McCaskie (born 1996), Barbadian cricketer

See also
McCaskey